The Vanguards were a rock band from Bærum, Norway that debuted in 1961.  Although the band disbanded eight years later, members continued to reunite for appearances during the 1970s.

The Vanguards were one of Norway's most popular rock band during the 1960s, playing mostly cover songs. Known band members included Bjørn Nordvang, Terje Rypdal, and Johnny Day.

Singles
 1963 - "I see you drafting Glugg" / "Charmaine"
 1963 - "Vanguard special" / "Poinciana"
 1963 - "A small golden ring" / "Twist little sister"
 1963 - "Roll over Beethoven" / "Why did I leave you"
 1964 - "Dream lover" / "Hi-heel Sneaker"
 1965 - "Mot ukjent sted" / "Smil, sanger og solskinn"
 1965 - "Lykkeveien" / "Du sa farvel"
 1966 - "I cry" / "On my mind"
 1966 - "All I want" (Flexi Single in weekly magazine)
 1966 - "Home again" / "You've made me glad"
 1967 - "My ancestral by" / "Be yourself"
 1967 - "Graduation day" / "Tonight, tonight"
 1967 - "Golden September" / "Donna Donna"
 1967 - "Daydream" / "I hide the tears in the rain"
 1968 - "I think I go along" / "My Song"
 1968 - "Boogaloo" / "I think I'll disappear"
 1968 - "Good night little friend" / "stroll around"

LP's and CD's

 1966 - Home again
 1966 - The Vanguard (Italy)
 1967 - The Vanguard (Sweden)
 1967 - Phnooole
 1980 - Norwegian rocks golden years
 1986 - Comanchero
 1990 - Twang 1990 - Twang
 2003 - Vanguard Special (double "CD)

External links
 Rockipedia.no
 Discogs.com
http://johnnyday.blogspot.com/?m=1

Norwegian musical groups